Burak Aksak (born 12 September 1985 in Istanbul, Turkey) is a Turkish screenwriter, director and actor. He is best known for writing Leyla ile Mecnun hit surreal comedy series. Her cousin is writer Selçuk Aydemir.

Filmography

References

External links
• 

1985 births
Living people
Turkish male television actors
21st-century Turkish male actors
Male actors from Istanbul
Anadolu University alumni
Writers from Istanbul